= Spin Out (video game) =

1986 video game

- Publisher(s): Interstel Corporation
- Release: 1986

Spin Out is a 1986 video game published by Interstel Corporation.

== Gameplay ==
Spin Out is a game in which the drivers compete to finish with the best time in the race.

== Reception ==
Rick Teverbaugh reviewed the game for Computer Gaming World, and stated that "overall, I like Spin Out for a enjoyable bare bones approach to auto racing."
